Events from the year 1646 in Denmark.

Incumbents 
 Monarch – Christian IV

Events
 30 August  Køge Pharmacy is founded.

Undated
 Møntergården is constructed by Falk Gøye in Odense.

Births
 3 January  Henrik Bornemann, clergyman and theologian (died 1710)
 16 April  Christian V of Denmark (died 1699)

Full date missing
 Elsje Christiaens, murderer (died 1684)
 Matthias Knutzen, author (died after 1674)

Deaths 
 25 May  Just Høg, statesman and landowner (born 1584)

Full date missing
 Morten Steenwinkel, architect (born 1595)

Publications
Thomas Bartholin: De Angina Puerorum Campaniae Siciliaeque Epidemica Exercitationes. Paris
 Christen Sørensen Longomontanus: Caput tertium Libri primi de absoluta Mensura Rotundi plani, etc

References 

 
Denmark
Years of the 17th century in Denmark